The Let's Get to It Tour was the fourth concert tour by Australian pop singer Kylie Minogue. As stated by Minogue herself in 1991, the tour was technically a continuation of the previous Rhythm of Love Tour which had already visited Australia and Asia. In addition to revising the setlist, she assembled a new band to work with her existing musical director and choreographer.  Backed by her five dancers, Minogue mounted the tour in support of her fourth studio album Let's Get to It (1991).

The show comprised an all-new couture wardrobe created by John Galliano and several new additions to the set list from the new album, many of which were written by Minogue herself. She wore a plastic raincoat, which was designed by Galliano.

By her choosing of outfits on the tour, the title "SexKylie" was given by the media in this period.

Background and development

The tour is an updated version of her last tour promoting for Rhythm of Love. A whole new stage wardrobe was conducted by British fashion designer John Galliano in Minogue's first collaboration with a major fashion designer.

In August 1991, Minogue said she was churning ideas around about different costumes, different designers and so on. Speaking on her inspiration for the tour's fashion, she said "Well, I don't know if this makes any sense but I'm looking into the future for inspiration. It probably sounds a bit odd but I know what I mean by it. Every one – me included – usually looks back into the past to get inspired for a new look but I'm trying to imagine what life's going to be like in the year 2000."

Reception
After the first show of the tour, a tabloid accused Minogue of copying Madonna's look from her Blond Ambition World Tour.

Writing for Chronicle Live in 2014, Gordon Barr said the performance she gave on the tour was a "polished" one he has seldom seen at the many other gigs he has been to.

Minogue also caused lots criticisms for her choice of costume on the tour. When being asked about the subject on Tonight Live with Steve Vizard, Minogue stated:

In 2013, VH1 listed her in the fishnet costume as one of her ten most "butt-iful" moments. Irish Examiner called the outfit "risque", but stated: "There IS such a thing as too much fishnet, and this is definitely overstepping the mark."

Set list
This set list was taken from Minogue's official website.

"Step Back in Time"
"Wouldn't Change a Thing"
"Got to Be Certain"
"Always Find the Time"
"Enjoy Yourself"
"Tears on My Pillow"
"Secrets"
"Let's Get to It"
"Word Is Out"
"Finer Feelings"
"I Should Be So Lucky" 
"Love Train"
"If You Were with Me Now" 
"Je Ne Sais Pas Pourquoi"
"Too Much of a Good Thing"
"Hand on Your Heart"
"What Do I Have to Do?"

Encore
 "I Guess I Like It like That"
"The Loco-Motion"
"Shocked"1
"Better the Devil You Know"

1 During the London and Dublin performances, Jazzi P appeared to perform with Minogue on "Shocked".

Tour dates

Broadcasts and recordings

Live! (or Live in Dublin for the Australian release) is a video album by Australian singer Kylie Minogue. It was recorded during her performance in Dublin on 8 November 1991. It was released on 9 April 1992 by EMI internationally and Mushroom in Australia on VHS format only. In Japan Alfa Records also issued it on Laserdisc. Although they appear on the set list of the tour, "Hand on Your Heart", "Je Ne Sais Pas Pourquoi", "Enjoy Yourself", "Secrets" and "Tears on My Pillow" were cut from the VHS release of the tour. "Got to Be Certain", "Finer Feelings" and "I Guess I Like It Like That" were all edited for the video release. The editor was Gareth Maynard.

Personnel 
Credits and personnel are taken from Minogue's official website.

Main

 Kylie Minogue – production, concept, wardrobe
 Terry Blamey – administrator
  Adrian Scott – music director
Nick Pitts – tour manager
 Henry Crallam – production manager
  Clive Franks – sound manager
Jonathon Smeeton – lighting director
 Venol John – choreographer
 Yvonne Savage – assistant
 John Galliano – wardrobe

Musicians

 Adrian Scott – keyboards
  John Creech – drums
 Jamie Jardine – guitar
 Craig Newman – bass
Tania Smith – keyboards
Jamie O'Neal – backing vocals
Susie Ahern – backing vocals
James Uluave – backing vocals

Dancers
 Venol John – dancer
Richard Allen – dancer
Cosima Dusting – dancer
Simone Kay – dancer
Mitchell Bartlett – dancer

See also
 List of Kylie Minogue concert tours
 Kylie Minogue discography
 Kylie Minogue videography
 List of Kylie Minogue films

References

Kylie Minogue concert tours
1991 concert tours
Kylie Minogue video albums
Live video albums
1992 video albums
Kylie Minogue live albums
1992 live albums